The 2020 United States presidential election in Nebraska was held on Tuesday, November 3, 2020, as part of the 2020 United States presidential election in which all 50 states plus the District of Columbia  participated. Nebraska voters chose electors to represent them in the Electoral College via a popular vote, pitting the Republican Party's nominee, incumbent President Donald Trump, and running mate Vice President Mike Pence against Democratic Party nominee, former Vice President Joe Biden, and his running mate California Senator Kamala Harris. Nebraska has five electoral votes in the Electoral College, two from the state at large, and one each from the three congressional districts.

Located in the conservative Great Plains, Nebraska is one of the most reliably Republican states in the country, having backed the Democratic presidential nominee only once since 1936, during Lyndon B. Johnson's 1964 landslide, and having gone to the Republican nominee by a double-digit margin in every presidential election since. However, Nebraska is one of two states, the other being Maine, to allocate its electoral votes by congressional district. A candidate receives one electoral vote for each district won while the statewide winner receives an additional two electoral votes. Ever since Nebraska first adopted this system in 1992, in practice the Republican nominee has almost always won all three districts, and hence all the state's electoral votes. The first time it split its electoral votes came in 2008 when Barack Obama carried Nebraska's 2nd congressional district, anchored by Omaha, and thus received one electoral vote from the state despite losing statewide. The 2nd district returned to the Republican column in the following two elections, but in 2020 it was considered a key battleground.

Trump carried Nebraska statewide by 19 points on Election Day, down from 25 points in 2016. Biden was able to flip the 2nd district, carrying it by 6.6 points, the best Democratic performance since Nebraska first adopted its system of allocation by district, and the first time in this period that the district has voted more Democratic than the nation. Trump received the state's other four electoral votes. Prior to the election, all news organizations declared Nebraska a safe red state, while most organizations viewed the 2nd district as either Lean Biden or a tossup. This was the first election in which both Nebraska and Maine would officially split their electoral votes.

Biden won only the two most populous counties in the state: Douglas County, home to Omaha, by 11 points, approximately the same margin Lyndon B. Johnson won the county with in 1964 and the best result for Democrats since that election, and Lancaster County, home to the state's second largest city and state capital Lincoln, where the University of Nebraska is located, by just under 8 points, another 56-year high for Democrats. While he didn't win the state's third largest, Sarpy County, a growing suburban county to the south of Omaha, which in all presidential elections from 1968 to 2016 except 2008 had backed the Republican candidate by at least 21 points, he reduced Trump's winning margin to only 11 points and won 43 percent of the vote there, again a 56-year best for Democrats. Biden also received more than 40 percent of the vote in two counties in the northeastern corner of the state: Thurston County with a Native American majority, and Dakota County with a large Hispanic population.

Per exit polls by the Associated Press, Trump's strength in Nebraska came from whites, who comprised 90% of the electorate, and specifically from Protestants with 70%. Post-election, many rural Nebraskans expressed worries about trade and the economy under a Biden presidency, with 59% of voters stating they trusted Trump more to handle international trade.

Joe Biden improved on Hillary Clinton's performance in Nebraska, as he did in most other states. Nebraska was one of 43 states where the Democratic nominee received a greater proportion of the two-party vote than in the prior election. Despite his loss, Biden's 374,583 votes are the most received by a Democratic candidate for president statewide in Nebraska.

Primary elections
The primary elections were held on May 12, 2020.

Republican primary

Donald Trump was declared the winner in the Republican primary, and thus received all of Nebraska's 36 delegates to the 2020 Republican National Convention.

Democratic primary
Joe Biden was declared the winner in the Democratic primary.

Libertarian primary

Jo Jorgensen was declared the winner of the Libertarian primary and went on to win the LP nomination.

General election

Final predictions

Polling
Aggregate polls

Statewide

in Nebraska's 1st congressional district

in Nebraska's 2nd congressional district

Electoral slates
These slates of electors were nominated by each party in order to vote in the Electoral College should their candidate win the state:

Results

As expected, Trump easily carried the state at large. However, because Nebraska (along with Maine) allocates its remaining electoral votes by congressional district, Joe Biden was able to win an electoral vote from Nebraska's second district, which covers the increasingly liberal Omaha metro area. Barack Obama also won the same district in 2008 before it went back to the Republican column in 2012 and 2016.

By county

By congressional district
Trump won two of Nebraska's three congressional districts.

Notes

 Partisan clients

See also
 United States presidential elections in Nebraska
 Presidency of Joe Biden
 2020 United States presidential election
 2020 Democratic Party presidential primaries
 2020 Republican Party presidential primaries
 2020 United States elections

References

Further reading

External links
 
 
  (State affiliate of the U.S. League of Women Voters)
 

Nebraska
2020
Presidential